is a Japanese football player who plays for V-Varen Nagasaki.

Playing career
Kakuda was born in Uji on 10 July 1983. He joined J2 League club Kyoto Purple Sanga (later Kyoto Sanga FC) from youth team in 2001. He debuted in May and Sanga was promoted to J1 League end of 2001 season. He became a regular player as left back of three back defense from 2002 and Sanga won the champions in 2002 Emperor's Cup first major title in the club history. However Sanga finished at the bottom place in 2003 season and was relegated to J2.

In 2004, Kakuda moved to J1 club Nagoya Grampus Eight. He played many matches as defensive midfielder and right side midfielder not only defender.

In May 2006, Kakuda was loaned to Kyoto Purple Sanga which was returned to J1 from 2006 season. He mainly played many matches as right side back. However Sanga finished at the bottom place and was relegated to J2 again.

In 2007, Kakuda returned to Nagoya Grampus Eight. However he moved to Kyoto Sanga FC in March. He played as regular player as center back and Sanga won the 3rd place in 2007 season. In J1 from 2008 season, although he lost his regular position, he played many matches as defender and defensive midfielder. However Sanga finished at the 17th place in 2010 season and was relegated to J2.

In 2011, Kakuda moved to Vegalta Sendai. Although 2011 Tōhoku earthquake and tsunami occurred in Sendai immediately after the opening 2011 season, Kakuda played as regular defensive midfielder and Vegalta finished at the 4th place which is best results in the club history. In 2012 season, Vegalta won the 2nd place and qualified for 2013 AFC Champions League. Although the club results were sluggish from 2013, he played many matches as defensive midfielder until 2014.

In 2015, Kakuda moved to Kawasaki Frontale. Although he played all 14 matches as regular center back until May, he could not play at all in the match from June.

In August 2015, Kakuda moved to Shimizu S-Pulse. Although he played many matches as center back, S-Pulse was relegated to J2 end of 2015 season first time in the club history. In 2016 season, S-Pulse won the 2nd place and was promoted to J1 in a year. However he could hardly play in the match in 2018.

In 2019, Kakuda moved to V-Varen Nagasaki which was relegated to J2 from 2019 season.

National team career
In November 2003, Kakuda was selected Japan U-20 national team for 2003 World Youth Championship. At this tournament, he played 4 matches as left back of three back defense.

Club statistics

References

External links

Profile at Shimizu S-Pulse

1983 births
Living people
Association football people from Kyoto Prefecture
Japanese footballers
Japan youth international footballers
J1 League players
J2 League players
Kyoto Sanga FC players
Nagoya Grampus players
Vegalta Sendai players
Kawasaki Frontale players
Shimizu S-Pulse players
V-Varen Nagasaki players
Association football defenders